Santosh Sobhan (born 12 July 1996) is an Indian actor who works in Telugu films. Son of film director Sobhan, Santosh made his debut in the film Golconda High School (2011). His successful films include Ek Mini Katha (2021) and Manchi Rojulochaie (2021).

Early life and career 
Santosh was born on 12 July 1996 to Telugu film director Sobhan. His uncle Chittajalu Lakshmipati was a comedian in Telugu films and his younger brother is actor Sangeeth Shobhan. 

Santosh completed his graduation in mass communication but opted to pursue a career in films like his father. He first appeared in Mohana Krishna Indraganti-directed sports film Golconda High School in 2011. 

In 2015, Santosh made his debut as a lead in Ram Mohan P.'s Thanu Nenu, alongside Avika Gor. Suresh Kavirayani of Deccan Chronicle called him a "surprise element" while The Hindu Y. Sunitha Chowdhary wrote that he showed a "lot of ease" and reminder her of actor Srinivas Avasarala. Following Thanu Nenu, Santosh took a break from a films. Santosh returned to cinema in 2018 with Paper Boy. The following year, he appeared in TV series The Grill.

In 2021, Santosh a played a young adult who suffers from small penis syndrome in Ek Mini Katha. Ram Venkat Srikar of Cinema Express appreciated his performance, writing, "Santosh Shoban’s reticent performance entwined with the deadpan dialogue delivery brilliantly complements the smutty humour." Later that year, Santosh starred in Maruthi-directed Manchi Rojulochaie, alongside Mehreen Pirzada. In his review of the film, Murali Krishna CH of The New Indian Express stated: "Santosh Sobhan gives a decent performance, but he has to work on his expressions."

Santosh is signed to appear in Prem Kumar, followed by B. V. Nandini Reddy's Anni Manchi Sakunamule, opposite Malavika Nair.His next film Kalyanam Kamaneeyam (2023 film) is slated to release in theaters on 14th Jan, 2023.

Filmography

Television

References

External links 

 

Living people
1996 births
Male actors in Telugu cinema
Male actors in Telugu television
Telugu male actors
21st-century Indian male actors
Indian male film actors
Indian male actors